Lloyd W. Lowrey (December 7, 1903 – March 13, 1992) represented the California's 3rd State Assembly district from 1941 to 1963.  He ran unopposed for 8 of his 11 campaigns for office.

Lowrey was born in Rumsey, California.  He married Helen Frances on November 3, 1945. They had three sons: Lloyd Jr., who was an attorney specializing in environmental and water rights issues, Jan Thomas, who followed his father into politics and ran the family ranch in Rumsey, and Timothy T. Lowrey, a botanist at University of New Mexico.

References

External links
Join California Lloyd W. Lowrey

Democratic Party members of the California State Assembly
1903 births
1992 deaths
20th-century American politicians
University of California, Berkeley alumni